The fourth round of AFC matches for 2018 FIFA World Cup qualification was played from 5 to 10 October 2017.

Format
In the fourth round, the third-placed teams from the two third round groups competed in a two-legged home-and-away play-off.

The order of legs was pre-determined by the AFC, announced during the draw for the third round. The third-placed team from Group A hosted the first leg, and the third-placed team from Group B hosted the second leg.

Qualified teams

Matches

Australia won 3–2 on aggregate and advanced to the inter-confederation play-offs.

Goalscorers
There were 5 goals scored in 2 matches, for an average of  goals per match.

2 goals

 Tim Cahill
 Omar Al Somah

1 goal

 Robbie Kruse

Notes

References

External links

Qualifiers – Asia: Round 4, FIFA.com
FIFA World Cup, the-AFC.com
FIFA World Cup 2018, stats.the-AFC.com

4
Qual4
Fifa
Fifa
Australia national soccer team matches
Syria national football team matches
Australia at the 2018 FIFA World Cup
October 2017 sports events in Asia
October 2017 sports events in Australia